Stephanie Sequeira (born June 30, 1993) is an American professional bodybuilder, model, personal trainer, and bodybuilding coach.

Background
Sequeira was born in Medellin, Colombia to Cuban emigrants, Jose and Olga. The family moved to Venezuela shortly after birth.  Sequeria spent four years running varsity track and cross-country in High School.

Sequeira became interested in bodybuilding and fitness modeling  in college and began her first coached offseason in January 2014. In May 2014, she graduated from college with a bachelor's degree in Psychology. Over the next two years, she worked on her Masters of Science in Human Resources while continuing to compete in National Physique Committee and International Federation of Bodybuilding and Fitness Pro shows.

Sequeira became a professional IFBB Bikini athlete in November 2015 at the NPC National Championships in Miami. She trained at LA Fitness, XSport, and the Quads Gym in Chicago, IL while preparing for this contest. She has become Blackstone Labs sponsored athlete.

Sequeira is also a bodybuilding coach specializing in the Bikini Division. In this regard, she is an assistant coach on Team Long.

Competitions

NPC Amateur
 Ancient City Classic 2015 - 2nd in Class
 Dextor Jackson Classic 2015 - 1st in Class
 NPC Junior National Championships 2015 - 16th in Class
 Wings of Strength Model Search, Chicago 2015 - 1st
 NPC National Championships 2015 - 1st in Class; earned pro card.

IFBB Pro Competitions
2016
 IFBB Prestige Crystal Cup - August 8, 2016 - 12th
 Naples Bikini Pro - August 27, 2016 - 11th
 Coastal USA's 2016 - November 27, 2016 - 13th

2017
 Optimum Classic - May 20, 2017 - 5th 
 Omaha Pro - June 9, 2017 - 8th 
 Ft. Lauderdale Cup - July 6, 2017 - 10th 
 Chicago Pro - July 13, 2017 - 16th 
 Iron Games - November 11, 2017 - 16th 
 Ferrigno Legacy Pro - November 18, 2017 - 10th

References

External links
 Website

1993 births
Living people
American female bodybuilders
21st-century American women